Nordic New Zealanders are New Zealand-born citizens whose origins are found in any of the Nordic countries (Denmark, Iceland, Norway, Sweden and Finland), or people from any of these countries who live in New Zealand.

Countries of origin
This is a list of the countries of origin. The numbers indicate the people born in their home countries and people of Nordic descend born in New Zealand.

  Danish New Zealanders estimate: 1,986
  Icelandic New Zealanders estimate: 120
  Norwegian New Zealanders estimate: 810
  Swedish New Zealanders estimate: 1,404
  Finnish New Zealanders estimate: 783

See also
Europeans in Oceania
Immigration to New Zealand
Pākehā

References

 
New Zealand